401 may refer to:

401 (number), the natural number following 400 and preceding 402
A year: 401 BC or AD 401
Ontario Highway 401, a highway that extends across Southern Ontario, Canada
There are also other roads named 401, see the List of highways numbered 401
401(a), a type of U.S. tax-deferred retirement savings plan defined by a subsection of the Internal Revenue Code
401(k), a type of U.S. employer-sponsored retirement plan defined by a subsection of the Internal Revenue Code
Bristol 401, a car produced by Bristol Cars in the early 1950s
HTTP 401, a status in the HTTP protocol indicating authentication has failed
.401 Winchester Self-Loading centerfire rifle cartridge introduced in 1910
 Area code 401
 Cessna 401, an airplane